Prince Akizzi was the ruler of Qatna in the fourteenth century BC. Prince Akizzi wrote three of the Amarna letters correspondence.

References
Journal of the Royal Asiatic Society of Great Britain and Ireland, 1990, Cambridge University Press for the Royal Asiatic Society 1990, p. 52
K. A. Kitchen, Ramesside Inscriptions, Blackwell Publishing 2000, p. 67
G. Maspero, 1904, History of Egypt, Part Four, Kessinger Publishing 2003, p. 278
William L. Moran, The Amarna Letters, Johns Hopkins University Press, 1987

External links
Letters from Akizzi of Qatna

Amarna letters writers
Qatna
14th-century BC rulers
14th-century BC people